Jim Browning may refer to:
 Jim Browning (trade unionist) (died 1983), British trade unionist
 Jim Browning (wrestler), (1903–1936), American professional wrestler
 Jim Browning (YouTuber), British YouTuber